Hedvig Hanson (born 22 April 1975 in Tartu) is an Estonian jazz vocalist.

In 1993, she won the music Eesti Televisioon (ETV) singing competition Kaks takti ette.

Hedvig Hanson's mother is singer Novella Hanson and her father is actor and singer Tõnu Kilgas. Her half-sister is actress Piret Krumm. Hanson's paternal grandparents were actors Ellen Kaarma and Lembit Mägedi.

Albums
 1997 "Love for sale" – Kaljuste Music Productions
 2000 "Let me love you" – BIO Management
 2001 "Tule mu juurde" – MT Holding
 2003 "What colour is love" – Emarcy / Universal
 2004 "Nii õrn on öö" – MT Holding Ltd.
 2005 "You bring me joy" – Universal
 2006 "Ema laulud" – Music Maker OÜ
 2008 "Kohtumistund" – Music Maker OÜ
 2009 "Armastuslaulud" – Music Maker OÜ
 2011 "Tants kestab veel" – Music Maker OÜ
 2013 "Esmahetked" – Music Maker OÜ
 2015 "Ilus elu" – Music Maker OÜ
 2017 "Talvine soojus" – Music Maker OÜ

Awards
Eesti Raadio Award, Musician of the Year (2003)
Estonian Music Awards, Female and Jazz Artist of the Year (2001)
Estonian Music Awards, Jazz Artist of the Year (2008)

References

Living people
1975 births
21st-century Estonian women singers
20th-century Estonian women singers
English-language singers from Estonia
Musicians from Tartu